Ballymena United Football Club is a semi-professional football club from Northern Ireland. Based in Ballymena, County Antrim, the team competes in the NIFL Premiership and plays home matches at the Ballymena Showgrounds which is owned by the Mid and East Antrim Borough Council. The club is managed by David Jeffrey.

The club was formed as Ballymena on 7 April 1928, when four local businessmen and football enthusiasts decided that the town of Ballymena needed a senior football team in the Irish League.

Nicknamed the 'Braidmen' or 'Sky Blues', latterly because of the colour of the home shirts, Ballymena have a rich history in Irish Cup, having won the competition six times.

The main club rivals of Ballymena United are Coleraine. The annual Boxing Day derby fixture between the two teams attracts large crowds and is one of the high-profile fixtures in the Northern Irish football league calendar.

Club history

Foundation and the War (1934–1946)
Following the demise of Ballymena Football Club at the end of the 1933–34 season, three men, Simon McCrory, William McNeice and T. Moore, set about forming a new club in Ballymena with a view to seeking admission to the Irish League as Ballymena's replacement. Crusaders were also applicants for the vacancy, but at the League's annual general meeting on 20 June 1934, the new club known as Ballymena United was chosen unanimously.

Ballymena United approached the new season with some confidence. The new club took an unprecedented step by appointing a manager which was a departure from the previous practice of team selection by committee. The man in charge was Joe Millar who arrived from Bournemouth & Boscombe and had previously been capped for Ireland, Millar used many of his contacts in Scotland to bring an influx of Scottish players to the Showgrounds. However, despite these new players and an Irish Cup semi-final appearance United suffered in their first season finishing a disappointing tenth in the League, their lowest finish to date. The 1934–35 also seen the introduction of the Reserve side at the Showgrounds.

The 1935–36 season was to be just as disheartening for United supporters as the club finished tenth again in the League table, and failed to progress in the majority of the cup competitions. If the previous season was one to forget, any hope that 1936–37 would bring any cheer where dashed during the close season with the departure of Jock McNinch to Sligo Rovers. McNinch was leaving the club after 315 games and with him the last remaining link to the 'old' Ballymena side. During the summer his contribution to the club was recognised when the club granted him a testimonial, the first such gesture by United.

Ballymena United finished bottom of the Irish League for the first time, after managing only four league wins over the course of the season. An Irish Cup run to the semi-final stage, before elimination to the mighty Belfast Celtic was the only cheer for the Light Blues. They carried this disastrous form into the following season when they suffered a record defeat to Derry City (1–9) and losing the next six games before the board appointed Steve Mitchell as player-manager – he instantly turned things around as Ballymena won 14 of their next 17 games. Unfortunately despite their Championship form they rose from bottom to fifth in the table, only 8 points behind eventual winners Belfast Celtic. The club also made their first appearance in the final of the County Antrim Shield though lost 3–2 to Linfield.

This run of confidence ran all the way through to the following season, as Ballymena United nearly completed an historic double of the Irish League and Irish Cup – eventually finishing runners-up in both competitions. Finishing an agonising five points behind Belfast Celtic in the league race and a fourth Irish Cup final saw a third defeat to Linfield in the showpiece event, this time a 2–0 defeat at Solitude. However, one year on Ballymena United went one better by lifting the 1940 Irish Cup after a 2–0 win over Glenavon in which Sclater and Moore. This was the last 'proper' Irish Cup before province wide football was suspended due to World War Two.
United were not to kick a ball in anger again until the 1946–47 season. The club withdrew from the Irish League shortly after the end of the season when the Showgrounds was taken over to assist the war effort. One can only wonder this squad of players could have achieved if given another couple of seasons together.

Post-war United (1946–1957)
Even though WW2 ended in time for the commencement of the 1945–46 season it was not until the following term that Ballymena United made their comeback into the Irish League. Home friendlies early in 1946 were arranged against Belfast Celtic and Linfield but both were cancelled because the Showgrounds complex was not ready following the removal of the troops who were stationed there.

A new manager, Billy Reid, was appointed on 1 May but only lasted until late October, resigning after citing he could not devote enough time to the job and control of team affairs went back to committee. United made their comeback on 17 August 1946 with a 2–1 home victory in the Gold Cup against Distillery. The Braidmen joined the Irish Regional League in its final season before the return of the Irish League the following season and finished a respectable sixth in what was a topsy-turvy season which included a semi-final appearance in the Irish Cup. The Sky Blues did suffer their heaviest ever defeat during the Regional League campaign, losing 10–1 to Belfast Celtic.
Ballymena United began the 1947–48 season with a new manager, Bob McKay, who was promoted from his role last season as chief scout and had previously had been in charge of Dundee United. McKay guided Ballymena United to an impressive third place in the Irish League. Despite a first round exit to Linfield in the Irish Cup, the game attracted a record crowd of 9,067 and was a real end-to-end affair which afterwards saw the transfer of Frankie Houghton to Newcastle United for £6,000 – which was quite a considerable sum back then.

April 1948 saw United play their first competitive game outside Northern Ireland when they travelled to Dublin to play Shelbourne in the Inter-City Cup, a game which Ballymena lost 1–0 but progressed to the quarter-finals after winning the first leg 4–1 – this set up a clash with Shamrock Rovers who won the tie 8–3 on aggregate. The season did not end trophyless as a 2–1 victory over Linfield in May 1948 brought the County Antrim Shield to the Ballymena Showgrounds for the first time in the club's history – that game saw the competitive debut of Eric Trevorrow, a 20-year-old signing from Glasgow junior club, Parkhead Juniors.

The following season began with much optimism after the success of the previous campaign, this optimism did not last long as Ballymena finished a disappointing tenth in the Irish League and failed to make any headway in any of the cup competitions. This ultimately cost Bob McKay his job in May 1949 during a stormy AGM, as McKay berated the board for interference with his team selections. Norman Kernaghan took over as player-manager and after a moderate first season he finished his second campaign as Irish Cup finalists and County Antrim Shield winners in 1950–51 – beating Cliftonville in the final.

For the second successive season Ballymena lifted a piece of silverware – one of only two occasions this has occurred – as Ballymena United lifted the Festival of Britain Cup after beating Crusaders 3–0 in the final in May 1952. The competition took the place of the Ulster Cup for one year as part of the Festival of Britain celebrations to mark the end of the war and the revival of Britain. The Sky Blues finished sixth in the race for the Gibson Cup and defender Eric Trevorrow was given the prestigious honour of being named Ulster Footballer of the Year by the Castlereagh Glentoran Supporters Club.

A third-place finish that season had many believing that United would pick up where they left off, becoming the biggest provincial side in the country; Having been the first team outside Belfast to win the County Antrim Shield. However, a series of poor seasons was stopped in 1951 with the club's second County Antrim Shield – beating Cliftonville 2–0.

Despite the fact that the Irish League had not left Celtic Park between 1936 and 1948; Belfast Celtic were forced to leave the Irish League and Ballymena benefited by grabbing some of their talented players, including a new player-manager Billy McMillan. McMillan was replaced by the experienced Walter Rickett after two seasons. United reached the Irish Cup Final in 1951, only to be beaten by Glentoran 3–1 at Windsor Park, with their only goal coming from Currie.

The following season, Ballymena United won the Festival of Britain Cup, beating Crusaders 3–0 at Solitude. The one-off competition was played in 1952 to coincide with the Festival celebrations throughout Great Britain, and the trophy still resides at the Showgrounds.

However, after this victory United went through another bleak period in the mid-1950s as United finished bottom of the league twice. In 1955 the club was forced to launch an appeal to clear its mounting debts – the Ballymena people responded – debts were paid and a small amount was left over to go into the club's coffers.

New beginning (1957–1969)
In 1957, Scottish born Alex McCrae took over as player-manager of Ballymena United – he had been a successful inside-forward for Charlton Athletic and Middlesbrough in his playing days. He brought instant success to the Braid, as Ballymena finished third and won the Irish Cup in 1957–58.

The 1958 Irish Cup winning team was deemed one of the best Ballymena United teams ever to grace the Showgrounds, as they deservedly beat Jackie Milburn's Linfield in the showpiece final – with McGhee and Russell scoring the goals in a 2–0 win at the Oval in front of 24,000 spectators.

The next year, with another impressive team marched onto another Irish Cup final (their eighth final); the Sky Blues were expected to beat Glenavon in a Windsor Park final. However United's bad luck struck again as they failed to beat Glenavon, only drawing 1–1 and were defeated 2–0 in the replay.

Former Liverpool legend, Geoff Twentyman, then came along as manager and brought the Ulster Cup to the Showgrounds in 1960 with a 3–1 win over Glenavon. Barr grabbed two final goals while McKinstry picked up the other. The following season, the Sky Blues were only two points away from winning the Irish League for the first time – finishing third in 1961–62.

Twentyman's success did not continue and he was replaced in time by George Smith, Dave Hickson, Alex Parker, and Dave Hickson again. Despite this hunt for success manager after manager failed, as the Braidmen constantly finished mid-table in the Irish League, with only one trophy in the 1960s. McCrae was then brought back to end another period of failure at the Warden Street Showgrounds

The rollercoaster seventies (1970–1978)
The Sky Blues reached an Irish Cup Final in 1970 as a mere 12,000, just over half the average Irish Cup final attendance in those days, watched United fall 2–1 to Linfield at Solitude. Fleming grabbed an early goal which proved United's un-doing as they then mistakenly tried to sit back and defend out the remainder of the game. Incidentally this was Linfield's last game at Solitude for over a quarter of a century, due to civil unrest. The other interesting point is that it was the first Irish Cup Final with substitutes – Nicholl filled that role for United.

Next came a colourful time in United's history as one of the most 'colourful' and arguably one of the most talented of United's players – Sammy Frickelton was appearing at the Showgrounds to the delight of many fans. Scottish born Frickelton was followed by controversy but was still an exciting part of the club's history.

Teenage goalkeeper Jim Platt was transferred to Middlesbrough (where he won 21 caps for Northern Ireland) for £7,000 and Ballymena Council purchased the Showgrounds in two major off the field happenings.
United was now under the charge of Arthur Stewart (as McCrae mysteriously resigned after a board member complained about his wages) as player/manager. United were involved in the incident which led to Derry City's expulsion from the Irish League as their bus was burnt on a visit to the Brandywell during the height of the troubles in the province.

On the field Jimmy Martin was the major sensation as his goals brought United's best performance in the ill-fated Texaco Cup – where the Sky Blues lost to Scottish side Airdieonians at the semi-final stage 1972, who went on to lose to Derby County in the final. United picked up the City Cup in 1971 for the only time in their history; Bobby Averill scored the goal as the Sky Blues picked up a long overdue trophy against Ards at the Oval.

In 1974 that same club beat United in the Irish Cup Final at Windsor Park. John Sloan scored but Ards ran out 2–1 winners. However, United won the Gold Cup – beating Glentoran 3–2 with Quentin McFall, Dessie Orr and Jimmy Brown scoring for the Sky Blues for the first and only time in the competition's prestigious history.

United then lost the final of the Gold Cup to Coleraine the subsequent year and Arthur Stewart was dismissed after a good service to the club, particularly in the early seasons of his five years in the notoriously unstable Ballymena hotseat.

Former favourite from the 1958 side Eddie Russell became player-manager and scored as United won the County Antrim Shield for the first time in 25 years – beating Distillery 4–0 at Inver Park. After the burning of the stand and by social club members of the travelling community, the Showgrounds underwent major work and the side was unable to play at the main pitch until the next season. On the pitch too United experienced more problems – going 13 matches without victory at one stage. Russell was sacked as a result of the team's poor performances and in came Billy Johnston.

United lost the 1978 Irish Cup Final 3–1 to Linfield at the Oval to complete a league and cup double. This meant though that Ballymena experienced a historic first in qualifying for the European Cup Winners Cup. United entertained top Belgian side SK Beveren, losing 3–0 and the score was repeated two weeks later in Antwerp, as the Braidmen fell 6–0 on aggregate.

The glory years (1979–1989)
During the 1978–79 season Johnston made way for the arrival of Alan Campbell and he moulded arguably one of the best United teams of recent years, who would constantly challenge for honours and even came second in the Irish League in 1979–80. This meant qualification for the UEFA Cup for the first time and a first (and only) win in Europe against East-German outfit FC Vorwaerts, only losing narrowly in the second leg.

On route to an early season cup game against Ards, manager Alan Campbell was involved in a car accident which meant that managerial duties had to be passed over to his assistant, Ivan Murray, on a caretaker basis as Campbell recovered from his horrific accident.

The following season seen a remarkable United side finish third and lift both the Irish Cup and the County Antrim Shield in the one campaign. The Irish Cup win over Glenavon was by a single Paul Malone strike at Windsor Park. Former Northern Ireland manager, Nigel Worthington was transferred to Notts County for a club record £125,000 fee after the Irish Cup win; United had also lost influential midfielder Gerry Mullan to Everton earlier in the season.
The reward for the Cup win was a Cup Winners' Cup tie against Italian giants AS Roma, the Sky Blues fought valiantly but succumbed to the relentless pressure of the multimillion-pound side and lost 6–0 on aggregate.

Ivan Murray took over from Alan Campbell who resigned in January 1982, but failed to reproduce the team's best form and was duly dismissed to be replaced by former Crusaders boss Ian Russell – who many thought would definitely bring success back to Warden Street.

Russell failed to take the Sky Blues to the next level, despite bringing Northern Ireland goalkeeper Jim Platt back home and also seen the late George Best turn out for the Sky Blues in a Friendly against Scottish side Motherwell. Russell barely lasted six months at the Showgrounds before being sacked by the trigger happy board.

After Ian Russell's departure, it was Jim Platt who took over as player-manager at the Showgrounds and United, inspired by Sion Mills teenager Johnny Speak, defeated Carrick Rangers in the Irish Cup Final in 1984. However, after becoming the first United player to win a full International cap since 1933 – he unceremoniously left to take up the managers role at bitter rivals Coleraine.

Alan Campbell returned for his second spell in June 1984, but left after only one season due to a combination of poor results and the fans treatment of his son; Alan Campbell Jnr. However, in that season Ballymena suffered what the press described as "One of the most embarrassing results in the club's history" – losing in both legs to Maltese minnows Ħamrun Spartans in the First Round of the Cup Winners' Cup.

Soon after this, tragedy struck the Braid and the Irish League as Brian Crockard, United's outstanding young defender died tragically whilst on holiday, Crockard, a former United player of the year, is still remembered to this day having the player's lounge named after him at the Showgrounds.

Jimmy Brown took the reigned from the departed Campbell in May 1985, but despite two full seasons in charge at Warden Street he could not turn the team's fortunes with only a single County Antrim Shield Final appearance to show for his troubles, he resigned in September 1987 after a humiliating defeat to Larne.

In stepped former Reserve Team boss Alex McKee, with John Garrett as his assistant fired the Sky Blues to the Irish Cup the following season, defeating Larne in a lack-lustre showpiece final in which Paul Hardy proved to be the winner with a cheeky back-heel past Vince Magee in the Larne goal. The reward for the win was a plum tie against Belgian giants RSC Anderlecht – who proceeded to give United a footballing masterclass the following season, winning 10–0 on aggregate

Barren nineties (1990–1999)
The Irish League came up with the idea of promotion and relegation, and decided that they would combine the places of the 1993–94 and 1994–95 seasons to form a total score, on which to base a league upon. After a shaky start from Hagan, he was replaced by former Glentoran-boss Tommy Jackson, who fared no better. After a dismal season, he lasted only a couple of months into the following campaign before the axe was wielded yet again by the United board in October 1994.

The managerial merry-go-round continued when local man Gary Erwin was appointed in October 1994 in a vain attempt to secure a place in the Premier League, despite a famous win against Linfield, he failed miserably and was shown the door in March 1995. Alan Fraser was brought in at the end of the 1994–95 season, in order to prepare for the forthcoming First Division campaign. Despite throwing the money about, United finished the following season well behind runaway leaders, Coleraine.

1996–97's crop of players finally brought a League Championship to the Ballymena Showgrounds for the first time, albeit the First Division, which Alan Fraser's side impressively won at a canter. This also ensured promotion to the top-flight after two seasons in the First Division as 21 wins from 28 games meant an astounding 15 point gap between United's nearest challengers, Omagh Town, in second place. Fraser's talented side also were close to a 'double' when they cruelly lost the final of the County Antrim Shield to Cliftonville on penalties after being on top for most of the game. The season ended with Dessie Loughery's testimonial against Coleraine at the Showgrounds, which produced a stunning 5–1 victory to give the United fans a taste of what to expect the following season.

Ballymena United made a blistering start in their first season in the Premier League in 1997–98 and looked to be genuine title challengers by Christmas time as they topped the table after a stunning 4–3 victory over reigning Champions Crusaders – which also meant one of the biggest crowds in years at Warden Street for the Boxing Day derby against Coleraine; with an estimated 7,000 strong crowd packing into the Showgrounds. I typical fashion it all went off the rails for Alan Fraser's side as he splashed out a club record fee of £20,000 for Crusaders striker Glenn Hunter but the goals never came and the in-form Barry Patton also saw his goals dry up as Ballymena finished sixth in the table – missing out on a top half finish on goal difference. The season almost ended in a trophy as they reached the final of the Irish News Cup, a cross-border cup competition for clubs in the North-West – but lost out to Omagh Town over two legs.

Fraser's aging side failed to push on the following season and the money was beginning to dry up restricting suitable replacements being brought in. Failure again to break into the top half of the Premier League table in 1999 was offset by a disappointing non-performance in the Irish Cup semi-final against Portadown, which ironically turned out to be 'final' as Portadown lifted the Irish Cup by default following Cliftonville's dismissal for fielding an ineligible player. Alan Fraser was relieved of his duties for failing to meet the ambitions of the United board just hours after the final League game of the season, which also proved to be long-serving Dessie Loughery's last game as he made a controversial move to Coleraine after 11 years at the Braid. Shay Hamill took charge for the final of the Irish News Cup, but for the second consecutive season Ballymena lost the final this time to Johnny Speak's Finn Harps. The search began for a new manager at Warden Street and a new era awaited.

The wait goes on (2000–2011)
Fraser's replacement and the man set to lead Ballymena United into the new century was former Glenavon and Bangor manager, Nigel Best who was appointed in May 1999. However, with his predecessor's aging side starting to break up and with little money to finance quality replacements; it was little surprise when Best's team struggled badly during the 1999–00 campaign. Striker and talisman Glenn Hunter proved his worth by almost single-handedly keeping the Sky Blues in the division, as United avoided relegation on the final day of the season after defeating Portadown at Shamrock Park to maintain top-flight status amidst wild scenes of jubilation.

More departures followed the following summer and despite an encouraging start to the 2000–01 season, United's frailties caught up with them and Nigel Best was sacked after an unacceptable run of results in December 2000, cumulating with a 5–2 defeat to Newry Town. Bizarrely the club appointed unqualified club physiotherapist George Magill was caretaker-manager until a suitable successor to Best could be found; Glenn Hunter, who had taken time out of the game to pursue a fire-fighting career would act as Magill's assistant. In January 2001, former Coleraine manager Kenny Shiels took the reins of the Showgrounds side with the sole aim of keeping the Braidmen in the Premier League. Despite a late flurry in the final weeks of the campaign Ballymena just were not good enough and suffered relegation to the First Division after failing to defeat Portadown at home, when a win would have at least guaranteed another shot at survival in the play-offs.

It proved a season of rebuilding in the second-tier of Irish League football as the erratic Shiels made a number of 'big-name' signings which all flopped before the eyes of the supporters; former Northern Ireland goalkeeper Tommy Wright, former Leeds United defender Paul Beesley and Liberian striker Leon Browne all failed miserably to make an impact at the Braid. This left Shiels with a number of totally inexperienced teenagers fighting his cause, however despite their best efforts, slumped to a dismal fifth-place finish during the 2001–02 season – Ballymena United's lowest ever placing in their history.

Despite the previous season's disappointment, Shiels' side bounced back with style the following season. Buoyed by the completion of an impressive new 2,000 seated stand at the Showgrounds, the free-scoring Sky Blues were playing an exciting and unstoppable brand of football, however finished the season with little to show for their season as they finished runners-up in the Ulster Cup, County Antrim Shield and First Division. The league campaign was particularly sickening, despite promotion, for Ballymena fans as they were leading the table for many weeks, only to capitulate to Dungannon Swifts during the final run-in. Media attention also circled around starlet striker Shea Campbell who bagged 38 goals and a Northern Ireland Under-21 cap as he was being hawked to moves across the water and also in the Irish League before committing himself to the Sky Blues.

Promotion back to the restricted sixteen team Premier League proved difficult at first for Shiels and his untested side – however the influence from former Nottingham Forest forward Nigel Jemson proved key to Ballymena's success during the 2003–04 campaign as they equalled their best placed finish in the Premier League by finishing sixth and also gaining a return to European competition for the first time in 15 years through the Intertoto Cup. Ballymena travelled to Danish side Odense in June 2004 and produced a remarkable scoreless draw against the full-time side – only to lose the home second leg heavily with Spanish side Villarreal waiting in the next round.

Shiels was given the finance to attempt to bring the Gibson Cup to Mid-Antrim for the first time and signed a number of quality local players in Rory Hamill, Gary Smyth, Gordon Simms and Tim McCann but his team did not produce a return on his investment and eventually cost Shiels his job after four and half seasons at the helm. The final nail in the coffin was the Irish Cup semi-final defeat to minnows Larne at the Oval, as the Braidmen finished a disappointing eighth after a season that had promised so much.

Former Northern Ireland and Ballymena United goalkeeper Tommy Wright took over as manager on a full-time basis – a first for the club. Despite a slow start, he stamped his authority on the side bringing a number of new players in including a young Scottish striker Kevin Kelbie, whose goals in the second half of the season almost fired United to their first trophy in 17 years when they agonisingly lost the County Antrim Shield final to Linfield at Seaview. A credible seventh place was reward for Wright's work over the course of the 2005–06 season.

The following year proved disappointing as the club failed to make any progression to becoming a side capable of winning trophies after finishing ninth, the highlight of the season was the visit of English Premier League side Manchester City to Warden Street as part of the transfer deal that took goalkeeper Richard McKinney to England eight years earlier. The next season though saw Wright's side finally come of age as after an incredible 4–2 victory at the Oval on New Year's Day 2008 they looked like potential title challengers. This was to be the pinnacle of the success as teenage sensation Johnny Flynn was sold to Blackburn Rovers and Wright was linked with a move to Norwich City. Although the manager signed a new contract in January his team collapsed in their pursuit of success and Wright resigned in April 2008 only to re-emerge at Norwich a few months later. Jim Grattan was appointed caretaker manager briefly before Roy Walker took charge from 2008 to 2011 when he was sacked after little progress made during his time at the club.

Glenn Ferguson era (2011–2016)
Following Walker's sacking, United asked permission from Lisburn Distillery to speak to their first team coach Glenn Ferguson and they successfully appointed him in June 2011. During Ferguson's tenure they secured their first major trophy in quite a while by winning the County Antrim Shield and reaching the 2014 Irish Cup final before losing to Glenavon by 2–1 with the Mid-Ulster side winning their first Irish Cup in 17 years. The following year, United reached the semi-final of the Irish Cup before being defeated 3–1 by Portadown at The Oval. United started the 2015–16 in horrible form. Losing to promoted side Carrick Rangers losing 1–7 to Glenavon and being hammered by bitter rivals Coleraine. The Sky Blues form picked up, with them beating champions Crusaders 2–0 before beating Linfield in the County Antrim Shield final at Windsor Park. Ferguson was sacked in 2016 following a concerning slide in form that threatened the club's Premiership status.

David Jeffrey era (2016–)
Following the sacking, the club spoke to legendary former Linfield manager and player David Jeffrey who, going into the interview, had little interest in the job. He found himself very impressed by what the board had to say, though, and decided to take the job, bringing former assistant Brian McLaughlin to the Showgrounds. His debut as manager was a 1–1 draw with champions Crusaders and his team won a series of games before going on a losing run, failing to enter the Europa League Play-Offs following a 0–2 defeat to relegation-threatened Portadown.
The following season, The Sky Blues had a relatively good season, spending a lot of time in the top six and they reached the League Cup final against Carrick Rangers after beating rivals Coleraine 3–0 after extra time. They won the league cup against carrick rangers following goals from Allan Jenkins and Conor McCloskey. The 2017/18 season was a relatively average season for the braid men as experienced players brought in to the team during the transfer window did not work out as planned for David Jeffrey and his staff, the club finished the season in sixth place and lost out on a Europa League spot to Cliftonilee in the NIFL play-off system. Following a squad revamp of nine players coming through the doors in the summer transfer window the club had a good season reaching the league cup final and finishing second in the league.  Between October and December they had a 19-game unbeaten run.

In June they defeated Faroese team NSI Runavik at the Showgrounds 2–0 and progressed to the next round after an away scoreless draw. In July they played in the UEFA Europa League qualifying rounds 2019 and were defeated by Malmö FF 7–0 away and 0–4 at the Showgrounds.

European record

Overview

Matches

UEFA ranking

Players

First team squad

Out on loan

Club staff

Club officials and office bearers
President: Norman McBurney
Vice-presidents: Robert Cupples & David Blair
Chairman: Vacant
Vice-chairman: Vacant
Chief Finance Officer: Tony Patterson
Company Secretary: John Torrington
Football Secretary: Jonny Irwin
Board of Directors: David Blair, Chris Selwood, John Murray
Sales and Marketing executive: Brian Thompson
Matchday Announcer: Davy King
Community Relations Officer: Iain Black
Supporter Liaison Officer: Emma Scott
Child Protection Officer: Eric Gilmore
Head of Youth Development: Stuart Donald and Jonny Hume (BUYA)
Chief Safety Officer: Adrian Scullion

Coaching staff
First Team Manager: David Jeffrey
First Team Assistant Manager: Brian McLaughlin
First-team coach: Davy Douglas / Nathan McConnell
Strength & Conditioning Coach
First Team Goalkeeping Coach: Darren Fox
Chief Scout: n/a
Reserve Team Manager:  Tommy McDonald
Team Attendant: Bertnel Thompson/Mark Craig
Sports Therapist: Gary Crosbie/Rebekah Jones
Club Doctor: Dr. Brian Patterson

Managerial history

Source: Ballymenaunitedfc.com

Honours

Senior honours
Irish Cup: 6
1927–28*, 1939–40, 1957–58, 1980–81, 1983–84, 1988–89
Northern Ireland Football League Cup: 1
2016–17
City Cup: 1
1971–72
Gold Cup: 1
1974–75
Ulster Cup: 3
1951–52**, 1960–61, 1980–81
Irish League First Division: 1
1996–97
County Antrim Shield: 6
1947–48, 1950–51, 1975–76, 1979–80, 2012–13, 2015–16

Intermediate honours
IFA Reserve League: 1
2006–07†
Steel & Sons Cup: 1
1995–96†
Louis Moore Cup: 1
1952–53†
George Wilson Cup: 2
1989–90†, 1990–91†
* Tournament was won as Ballymena
** Tournament was renamed the Festival of Britain Cup for one season
† Won by Ballymena United Reserves

Source: Ballymenaunitedfc.com

Records

Club records
Wins
Record Home League Victory: 8–0 v Cliftonville, (18 September 1965); 8–0 v. Glenavon (8 March 1975); 8–0 v. Distillery (8 December 1979)
Record Away League Victory: 8–0 v. Newry Town (17 December 1994)
Most League Wins in a Season: 21 in 28 matches (1996–97)
Fewest League Wins in a Season: 3 in 22 matches (1956–57)

Defeats
Record Home League Defeat: 0–8 Belfast Celtic, (5 November 1938); 0–8 Cliftonville, (17 November 2012)
Record Away League Defeat: 1–9 Derry City, (23 August 1937); 0–8 Ards, (12 February 1949)
Most Defeats in a Season: 20 in 26 matches (1936–37)
Fewest Defeats in a Season: 3 in 28 matches (1996–97)
Most Draws in a Season: 16 in 36 matches (1999–00)

Goals
Most goals scored in a season: 82 in 26 matches (1939–40)
Fewest goals scored in a season: 20 in 22 matches (1976–77)
Most goals conceded in a season: 87 in 26 matches (1936–37)
Fewest goals conceded in a season: 21 in 22 matches (1980–81)
Most clean sheets in a season: 9 in 22 matches (1980–81)

Source: Ballymenaunitedfc.com

Leading goalscorers by season

Source:

List of internationals
This is a list of players with appearances at international level while playing for Ballymena United.

 Jackie Mahood (1 cap)
 Jimmy McCambridge (2 caps)
 Jock McNinch (3 caps)
 Jim Platt (1 cap)

Source: Ballymenaunitedfc.com

References

External links
 Official Ballymena United Website
 Ballymena United page on the IPL Website
 Ballymena United Statistics and Results at the Irish Football Club Project

 
Association football clubs established in 1934
Association football clubs in Northern Ireland
NIFL Premiership clubs
Association football clubs in County Antrim
Sport in Ballymena
1934 establishments in Northern Ireland
Phoenix clubs (association football)